Niyi Makanjuola (born 16 February 1980) is a Nigerian businessman, investor and chairman of Caverton Helicopters, Group CEO of Raven Resources Group and Visionscape International Holdings. 
Niyi is the son of Chief Remi Makanjuola, the president of Caverton offshore support group.

Business career 
He moved back from the UK to join Caverton Group, he then started Caverton Helicopters a wholly owned Nigerian helicopter operator in the year 2002 as a subsidiary of the Caverton Group. Niyi is also the Group CEO of Visionscape Group. He led Visionscape Group into Africa. The waste management subsidiary Visionscape Sanitation Solutions was awarded a 10-year waste management contract by the Lagos State Government following environmental reforms by the former Governor Akinwunmi Ambode administration.

References 

Building waste-to-energy infrastructure in Africa
Inside the elite world of Nigerian polo

Living people
Nigerian businesspeople
1980 births
Place of birth missing (living people)